Maris Martinsons is a professor of management currently associated with the City University of Hong Kong, the Stockholm School of Economics, and the University of Toronto. He received his B.A.Sc. in engineering science and MBA from the University of Toronto, and a PhD in industrial and business studies from the University of Warwick. He has served as editor for the following scholarly journals: IEEE Transactions on Engineering Management, the Journal of Applied Management Studies, the Journal of Information Technology Management, the Journal of Management Systems, and the Communications of the ACM.  

Martinsons has worked as a business consultant for companies including Ernst & Young, DRI/McGraw-Hill, and McKinsey & Co., and has served as an external advisor to the governments of Hong Kong and Latvia.

Martinsons exemplifies a new generation of global scholars. A Latvian-Canadian who was educated in both North America and Europe, Martinsons has been a visiting professor at universities on six continents and is now based in the Asia-Pacific region. He worked to internationalize the (U.S.) Academy of Management, primarily by bridging the East-West divide.
 
Martinsons is a leading authority on strategic management, organizational change, and knowledge management/information systems.   His research and insights have been published widely in Chinese, French, German, Japanese, Korean, Latvian, Russian and Spanish as well as English.

Martinsons has researched the strategic management of competitive enterprises in uncertain business environments as well as the diagnosis, planning and implementation of transformational organizational change.  The level of analysis in his studies has ranged from individuals (top management decision making) and small groups (knowledge management systems) to organisations (business performance management, links between business strategy and information technology/systems) and entire industries and economies (strategic intelligence in pre-handover Hong Kong, post-Soviet reform in Latvia, e-commerce in 21st century China).  Martinsons also pioneered the research of both green business issues (sustainable development and environmental technologies) and information ethics in the context of Hong Kong and China. According to Google Scholar, Maris Martinsons has authored 3 of the 10 most cited articles on Chinese management while his publications have received more than 7,000 citations. According to a Stanford University study, Professor Martinsons ranks among the Top 2% of the world's scientists. 

Martinsons received the Distinguished Young Scholar Award from the International Association of Management in 1995. He has been a keynote speaker at meetings of scholarly societies, industry groups and professional associations, such as the Baltic Business Congress, the East Asian Executive Forum, the International Association of Management, the Pacific Rim Leadership Summit, the Peak Time international business case competition and the World Knowledge Forum.
  
Martinsons has been a pioneer with action research and e-learning. Based on a philosophy that stresses the integration of theory and practice and the application of systematic frameworks/models and principles, the "Martinsons on Management" learning platform and a series of "Management by Martinsons" masterclasses have played significant roles in professionalizing management in transitional economies such as mainland China and the Baltic States. The programs incorporate various intellectual and physical challenges that take participants beyond their comfort zones to develop both greater confidence and competence. He has also used IT extensively to develop multimedia teaching materials and online education environments that take the learning process far beyond the classroom.
 
Martinsons is also an accomplished athlete, having represented Canada, Latvia and Hong Kong in international sporting competitions
.

Publications

Book
Information technology and the challenge for Hong Kong / edited by Janice M. Burn and Maris G. Martinsons. Hong Kong : Hong Kong University Press, c1997.

Dissertation
Strategic Intelligence in Hong Kong, How chief executives managed information/knowledge amidst the environmental uncertainty of pre-handover Hong Kong / University of Warwick

Scholarship
According to Google Scholar, the most cited peer-reviewed journal articles by Maris Martinsons are:
Martinsons, M., Davison, R., Tse, D. (1999). The balanced scorecard: A foundation for the strategic management of information systems, Decision Support Systems, 25(1), pp. 71–88. Cited more than 900 times in English and 200 times in other languages.
Davison, R.M., Martinsons, M.G., Kock, N. (2004). Principles of canonical action research, Information Systems Journal, 14(1), pp. 65–86. Cited more than 1000 times.
Martinsons, M.G., Westwood, R.I. (1997). Management information systems in the Chinese business culture: An explanatory theory, Information and Management, 32(5), pp. 215–228. Cited more than 700 times in Chinese and 300 times in English.
Martinsons, M.G. (2008). Relationship-based e-commerce: Theory and evidence from China, Information Systems Journal, 18(4), pp. 331–356. Cited more than 600 times, including 250 times in English.
Martinsons, M.G., Chong, P.K.C. (1999). The influence of human factors and specialist involvement on information systems success, Human Relations, 52(1), pp. 123–151. Cited 300 times.
Davison, R.M., Ou, C.X.J., Martinsons, M.G. (2013). Information technology to support informal knowledge sharing, Information Systems Journal 23(1), pp. 89-109. Cited more than 200 times.
Martinsons, M.G., Davison, R.M. (2007). Strategic decision making and support systems: Contrasting American, Japanese and Chinese Management, Decision Support Systems, 43(1), pp. 284–300. Cited more than 150 times.
Martinsons, M.G. (1993) Outsourcing information systems: A strategic partnership with risks, Long Range Planning, 26 (3), pp. 18–25. Cited more than 150 times.
Martinsons, M.G. (2002). Electronic commerce in China, Information & Management, 39(5), pp. 71–79.  Cited more than 100 times in English and 200 times in Chinese.
Martinsons, M.G. (2004). ERP in China, Communications of the ACM, 47(7), pp. 65–68.  Cited more than 150 times.
Burrows, G.R., Drummond, D.L., Martinsons, M.G. (2005). Knowledge management in China, Communications of the ACM, 48(4), pp 44–48. Cited more than 50 times in English and 150 times in Chinese.
Martinsons, M.G., Hempel, P.S. (1995).  Chinese management systems: historical and cross-cultural perspectives, Journal of Management Systems, 7(1), pp. 1–11. Cited more than 60 times in English and 200 times in Chinese.
Martinsons, M.G., Martinsons, A.G.B. (1996). Conquering cultural constraints to cultivate Chinese management creativity and innovation, Journal of Management Development 15(9), pp. 18–35. Cited more than 100 times.

Martinsons, M.G. (1994). Benchmarking human resource information systems in Canada and Hong Kong, Information & Management, 26 (6), pp. 305–316. Cited more than 100 times.

External links
Google Scholar profile
{https://www.cb.cityu.edu.hk/News-and-Events/news/2021/02/Seven-CB-faculty-members-listed-the-worlds-top-2-scientists Top 2% Scientists list]
City University scholarship profile
SSRN author profile

1960 births
Living people
Alumni of the University of Warwick
University of Toronto alumni
Academic staff of the City University of Hong Kong